The 48th edition of the Vuelta a Colombia was held from April 25 to May 10, 1998. Only 68 cyclists (out of 93) completed the race.

Stages

1998-04-25: Villavicencio — Villavicencio (5.8 km)

1998-04-26: Circuito del Llano (172 km)

1998-04-27: Villavicencio — Cáqueza (147 km)

1998-04-28: Funza — Girardot (131 km)

1998-04-29: Girardot — Neiva (172 km)

1998-04-30: Neiva — Ibagué (208 km)

1998-05-01: Circuito del Café — Calle (144 km)

1998-05-02: Santa Rosa de Cabal — Alto de Santa Helena (229 km)

1998-05-03: Medellín — Manizales (195 km)

1998-05-04: Manizales — Dorada (177 km)

1998-05-05: Puerto Boyacá — Barrancabermeja (202 km)

1998-05-06: Barrancabermeja — Bucaramanga (124 km)

1998-05-07: Bucaramanga — Barichara (148.7 km)

1998-05-08: Barbosa — Duitama (138.9 km)

1998-05-09: Paipa — Tunja (43.5 km)

1998-05-10: Circuito en Bogotá (104 km)

Final classification

Teams 

Telecom — Kelme

Petróleos de Colombia — Energía Pura

Kelme Costa Blanca — Eurosport

Aguardiente Antioqueño — Lotería de Medellín

Ciclistas de Jesucristo

Aguardiente Néctar

Estampados Panamericanos — Distrillantas

Cicloases

Aguardiente Néctar — Ron Santafé

Lotería de Santander — Mixto Telecom

Flavia — Meta — Alcaldía de Cómbita

See also 
 1998 Clásico RCN

References 
 cyclingnews
 pedalesybielas(  2009-10-22)

Vuelta a Colombia
Colombia
Vuelta Colombia